The men's 200 metres sprint competition of the athletics events at the 1979 Pan American Games took place on 9 and 10 July at the Estadio Sixto Escobar. The defending Pan American Games champion was James Gilkes of Guyana.

Records
Prior to this competition, the existing world and Pan American Games records were as follows:

Results
All times shown are in seconds.

Heats
Held on 9 July

Wind:Heat 1: +2.8 m/s, Heat 2: +1.1 m/s, Heat 3: +0.1 m/s

Semifinals
Held on 9 July

Wind:Heat 1: +1.1 m/s, Heat 2: +2.5 m/s

Final
Held on 11 July

Wind: +3.9 m/s

References

Athletics at the 1979 Pan American Games
1979